Magnus III of Mecklenburg (July 4, 1509 in Stargard – January 28, 1550 in Bützow) was a member of the House of Mecklenburg who was the first Lutheran administrator of the Prince-Bishopric of Schwerin, nevertheless referred to as Prince-Bishop. He was the son of Henry V, Duke of Mecklenburg and Ursula of Brandenburg. He was elected bishop in 1516, but due to his minority and lack of papal confirmation, he only began ruling as an administrator in 1532. In the next year, he introduced the Protestant Reformation. He married Elizabeth of Denmark, eldest daughter of King Frederick I of Denmark and his second wife, Sophie of Pomerania. They had no children.

References

|-

1509 births
1550 deaths
16th-century Lutheran bishops
Roman Catholic bishops of Schwerin
House of Mecklenburg-Schwerin
Heirs apparent who never acceded
Sons of monarchs